Scouting in Quebec has a long history, from the 1900s to the present day, serving thousands of youth in programs that suit the environment in which they live.

Anglophone Scouting in Quebec

Quebec is administered by the Quebec Council of Scouts Canada, which includes the Quebec Rover Round Table.

Areas
Abenaki Area,
Eastern (Montreal) Area,
Ohiyo Area,
Stoney Point Area,
West Island area,
Laval Larentians Area,
Chavalla Area,
St. Lawrence Cartierville Area,
Kebec Area,
St. Lawrence Appalachians Area,
Saguenay Lac St-Jean Area,
North Shore Area,
Gaspé Area.

Local Groups and sections
Among Quebec's varied Scouting groups are Scouts, Sea Scouts, Beavers, Cubs, Rovers and Venturers.

Tamaracouta Scout Reserve
Tamaracouta Scout Reserve is a Scout camp located near Mille Isles, Quebec. The camp, which claims to be the oldest continuously-operating Scout camp in the world, is situated on 1000 acres (4 km²) of forest in the Laurentian Mountains. It is owned and operated by Scouts Canada, Quebec Council. The camp is open year-round and offers a staff summer camp program.

The camp opened in 1912 with funds provided by a group of generous citizens led by Colonel E.A. Whitehead. Originally a farm, the property formerly belonged to the Dawson family of Mille Isles. The name Tamaracouta comes from two sources. There are a large number of Tamarack trees located on the property. The word couta meaning body of water in a First Nations language.

After World War I, the camp decided to adopt a Hudson's Bay Company theme. Since that time, campsites have been named after the HBC Trading Posts. Staff positions also take HBC names, such as Camp factor instead of Camp Director.

The Tamaracouta Scout Reserve hosted the 11th Canadian Scout Jamboree, in July 2007, with 10,000 campers.

Knights of Tamara
The Knights of Tamara is an honour camping society formed in 1933. The Knights recognize outstanding campers who have shown devotion to Camp Tamarcouta during summer camp. As of 2005, over 3500 campers have become Knights. To become a Knight, a camper must meet certain requirements, such as having camped at TSR for a certain amount of time, being at least 14 years old by the end of the calendar year in which they are being knighted and be nominated by their peers. If their nomination is approved, they become a squire at a ceremony near the beginning of their week of camp. During the week, they must complete a work vigil, and an overnight vigil which consists of sleeping out alone one night in the woods, and also learning the words to "Hail Tamaracouta", a traditional song among other tasks. Squires are easily recognized by the purple ring of indelible mystery ink (referred to as squire juice) painted on the face in a circle passing between the eyes and the hairline, between ears and eyes, and circling through the uppermost part of the chin. Squires must present themselves for "ringing" each morning at a very specific time; being late one day earns the squire a purple dot on the nose and two days earns them a purple chinstrap followed by one of many other decorations such as a second inner ring, a fully purple nose or any design of the ringer's discretion. If a squire misses a "ringing" for a poor reason, break camp rules, or act in a fashion unbecoming of a squire, they may be stripped of their squire status.

Originally, at the end of the week, squires were presented for the last time in a special public ceremony which included a Joust by pairs of squires on a canvas tarp using first lard and then coco, the winner being the least covered in coco. The lard and coco jousts were stopped after females were invited to become Knights and to conform with Scouts Canada strict anti hazing policy. Initially, this style of jousting was replaced by a joust involving padded staffs used by 2 squires on a log, however, recently, around 2014, the joust was once again changed to 3 rounds of combat with padded longsword, padded shortsword and shield, and the option of either padded sword with shield or 2 padded swords.  Following the joust, there are other steps, including the final "Second Ceremony", which is for Knights only. Knights wear a bracelet with a large black bead tied with a piece of leather string around the right wrist. After twelve years, the knight is entitled to wear a silver bead. Only a silver bead knight can become a Grand Knight (master of ceremonies). At founding in 1933, and for several decades thereafter, knights were given a colored bead reflecting the season in which they had become knighted.

Francophone Scouting in Quebec

WOSM member association
 Association des Scouts du Canada is the largest francophone association in Canada. Their head office is located in Montreal. Its 13,000+ members are divided into several districts depending on the regions where they are located. The district of "Scout du Montréal Métropolitain" is currently the largest one with over 3000 members.

UIGSE member associations
 Association Evangélique du Scoutisme au Québec

Independent associations

There are also a number of independent Scouting associations active in Quebec. Among them are:

 Association des Aventuriers de Baden Powell or Adventurer Association of Baden Powell, a bilingual association also active in several other provinces, ±1500 members
 Association de Scoutisme d'Actions

Girl Guiding in Quebec

Guides are served by the Girl Guides of Canada-Guides du Canada.

Girl Guide Camp WaThikAne (pronounced wahtickani) is situated on Lac Bouchette, 96 kilometres north of
Montreal, near the town of Morin Heights, Quebec. In operation since 1926, WaThikAne has 6 fully equipped campsites, 2 equipped pioneer campsites and a fully equipped (partially heated) lodge. The
main camp area is suitable for day or overnight for any age group. All camp users have access to the
large activity room in the lodge.

See also

Association des Scouts du Canada
Union Internationale des Guides et Scouts d'Europe

References

External links
 Quebec Council
 Tamaracouta
 Girl Guides of Canada- Québec Council

Scouting and Guiding in Canada